Rajesh Roshan Lal Nagrath (born 24 May 1955) is an Indian Hindi cinema music director and composer. He is the son of music director Roshan and singer Ira Roshan.

Personal life
Rajesh Roshan has a Punjabi Hindu father and Bengali Brahmin mother, and has two children, a son (Eshaan Roshan) and a daughter (Pashmina Roshan). He is the son of Hindi film composer Roshan. He is the brother of Indian film producer and director Rakesh Roshan.

Career
Rajesh Roshan had a successful collaboration with Kishore Kumar, Basu Chatterjee, Dev Anand, Mohammed Rafi, Lata Mangeshkar, Asha Bhosle. He shot to fame with the score for the 1974 film Kunwara Baap and the 1975 film  Julie; for the latter he won the Filmfare Best Music Director Award. 

Roshan scored for Kunwara Baap (1974) and then in three back-to-back hit films: Des Pardes, Man Pasand, and Lootmaar. He went on to compose melodious tunes and made Kishore Kumar sing them in films like Mama Bhanja, Doosra Aadmi, Muqaddar, Swami, Priyatama, Yehi Hai Zindagi, Ek Hi Raasta, Swarag Narak, Inkaar, Khatta Meetha, Baton Baton Mein, Do Aur Do Paanch, Kaamchor, Hamari Bahu Alka, Jaag Utha Insan, Bhagwaan Dada, Ghar Sansar followed by films with Rajesh Khanna like Janta Hawaldar, Nishaan, Babu and Aakhir Kyon?.

In the 1990s, he worked in albums like Karan Arjun (1995), Sabse Bada Khiladi (1995), Papa Kehte Hai (1996), Koyla (1997), Keemat – They Are Back, Daag: The Fire (1999), Dastak (1996),  Kya Kehna (2000) and Kaho Naa... Pyaar Hai (2000).

Critics believe that several of his most popular songs are closely based on popular songs from other countries.

Filmography

As a music director:

References

External links
 

1955 births
Living people
Indian film score composers
Filmfare Awards winners
Punjabi people
Bengali musicians